Wells Inn, also known as the Hotel Wells, is a historic hotel located at Sistersville, Tyler County, West Virginia, United States. It was built in 1894–1895, and is a two-story, brick building featuring a two-story verandah.  The interior features decor of the 1890s, including a mosaic tile floor, oak furnishings, and a tiled fireplace.  The hotel was undergoing renovation in 2010.

It was listed on the National Register of Historic Places in 1972.

References

Hotel buildings on the National Register of Historic Places in West Virginia
Hotel buildings completed in 1895
Buildings and structures in Tyler County, West Virginia
National Register of Historic Places in Tyler County, West Virginia